Fourth Doctor comic stories is a collection of the offscreen and comic adventures of the fourth incarnation of The Doctor, the protagonist of the long-running, hit sc-fi series, Doctor Who.

History
When 'Doctor Who Magazine' began publishing in 1978, the Fourth Doctor (played by Tom Baker) was the current Doctor on television.

Doctor Who Magazine took over an ongoing regular comic strip presence of the Doctor's adventures from TV Comic. Central to the concept of Doctor Who Magazine (or Doctor Who Weekly as it was then), was to offer more mature comic strip adventures than had previously appeared.

The Doctor Who Magazine comic strip launched with the Doctor travelling on his own. Later a number of new as well as more familiar characters were included. (These decisions were largely determined by the issue of image rights).

While most of the adventures occur within their own continuity, direct references to the television series make placing these adventures into on-screen continuity problematic.

While Doctor Who Magazine mostly uses the current Doctor in the regular comic strip adventures, later Fourth Doctor comic strip stories have appeared from time to time in the regular magazine, specials and in other publications. The Fourth Doctor's comic strip adventures have gone through the most reprints and his early DWM strips are widely regarded as among the best.

Polystyle comic strips

TV Comic

Doctor Who Magazine comic strips

Doctor Who Weekly

Doctor Who Yearbook

Titan Comics

See also
 List of Doctor Who comic stories
 First Doctor comic stories
 Second Doctor comic stories
 Third Doctor comic stories
 Fifth Doctor comic stories
 Sixth Doctor comic stories
 Seventh Doctor comic stories
 Eighth Doctor comic stories
 War Doctor comic stories
 Ninth Doctor comic stories
 Tenth Doctor comic stories
 Eleventh Doctor comic stories
 Twelfth Doctor comic stories

Fourth Doctor stories
Comics based on Doctor Who